Camptoloma kishidai is a moth of the subfamily Arctiinae. It is endemic to Guangdong in China.

The wingspan is about 37 mm.

External links
 , 2005: Two new species of the genus Camptoloma (Lepidoptera: Noctuidae) from China. Florida Entomologist 88 (1): 34-37. Full article: 

Arctiinae
Moths described in 2005
Moths of Asia